Howmeh-ye Sharqi Rural District is a rural district (dehestan) in the Central District of Izeh County, Khuzestan Province, Iran. At the 2006 census, its population was 17,753 in 3,098 families.  The rural district has 56 villages.

References 

Rural Districts of Khuzestan Province
Izeh County